Berber Canadians are Canadian citizens of Berber descent or persons of Berber descent residing in Canada. According to the 2011 Census there were 25,885 Canadians who claimed Berber ancestry.

See also 
Middle Eastern Canadians
Berbers in France

References 

Ethnic groups in Canada